Bontang is a city on the eastern coast of the island of Borneo in Indonesia, in the province of East Kalimantan. It is also the third most densely populated place in the province after Balikpapan and Samarinda.

History

Etymology 
Bontang refers to the town's traditional status as a humble village populated mostly by immigrants. 'Bon' can refer in Indonesian to 'receipt' and 'tang' to 'debt.' Alternately, the name of the town means 'a group of visitors'. A coastal town, Bontang was initially a settlement governed under the Kutai Sultanate based in Tenggarong.

Colonial era 
In 1920, the village of Bontang was established as a sub-district town, which was at that time called the Onder Van Bontang District. Bontang was still a sub-district under the leadership of a  assistant who was a cleric in the government of Sultan Aji Muhammad Parikesit, the 19th Sultan of Kutai Kartanegara (1921-1960).

Independence era 
Since 1954, a district head has taken office. The enactment of Law No. 27 of 1959 concerning the establishment of the Regional Level (Dati) II in East Kalimantan removed the status of self-government. In 1972, the government of the then Kutai Regency recognized Bontang as a district.

Major development of Bontang as an industrial area took place following the establishment of two major companies, PT Badak Natural Gas Liquefaction in 1974, and PT Pupuk Kaltim, a company specializing in the production of ammonia and fertilizer, three years later. Both companies built facilities and infrastructure that were very important for the economic growth of the city,

From 1978 onwards, Bontang experienced rapid regional expansion. Consequently, the central government upgraded Bontang from a district to an administrative city (kota administratif - kotif), by government law No. 20 of 1989 and followed up with the expansion of the Kotif region from one district to two - North Bontang and South Bontang Districts.

In 1999, Bontang became an autonomous independent city (kotamadya). A third district - West Bontang - was created on 16 August 2003.

Geography 

Bontang is located between 117° 23 E and 117° 32 E and 0° 01 N and 0° 12 N. It administers an area of 497.57 km2.

Within this area, only 29% is land. The city is dominated by flat lands ranging from 0 – 106 meters above sea level, but also includes several hills. Approximately 48% of the city's land area is located in coastal regions and is characteristically level with a slope of 0 - 2%. It is bordered by East Kutai Regency in the north and west, Makassar Strait in the east, and Kutai Kartanegara Regency in the south. Soil deposits in the city largely consist of podzol in the interior and alluvium sediments in the coastal region. This makes the city prone to erosion and the use of land for agriculture or development requires prior soil stabilisation.

The city is part of the Kutai basin, and is dominated by quartz sand and sandstone formations created by sediment from nearby rivers.

Demographics 
In 2021, the city population had increased by 1.07% compared with the previous year. The sex ratio as of 2021 was 100 females:108 males. As with most Indonesian cities, the population is young, with people in the age range 15 – 64 years accounting for around 70%. The most densely-occupied district in 2021 is North Bontang (2,530 per square kilometre), and the least dense is South Bontang (608 per square kilometre).

Economy 
In 2010, Bontang had the highest municipal GDP (nominal) per capita in Indonesia, amounting to Rp375,407,000 (US$38,306) according to Statistics Indonesia. However, there has been a decreasing trend in income and GDP per capita since 2015 due to the decline of coal mining and LNG production caused by negative economic growth.

Fishing and agriculture 

The fishing industry in Bontang is small, consisting mainly of small-scale fish farming for local consumption in Bontang and nearby cities, such as Balikpapan. A small amount of the catch is exported to Makassar and Hong Kong. Only a small proportion of the land in Bontang is available and/or suitable for farming. As a result, only about 4% of Bontang residents are involved in agriculture.

Manufacturing 

PT Pupuk Kaltim was established in 1977. It is an Indonesian government-owned fertilizer company that manufactures ammonia and urea from the area's natural gas. The company operates four units producing ammonia and five units producing urea, resulting in an annual output of 1,850,000 tons of ammonia and 2,980,000 tons of urea. The ammonia production is exported to countries such as South Korea, Taiwan, the Philippines, and India, as well as being used locally in Indonesia whilst urea is distributed to national rice farmers and plantations (rubber, oil palm, etc.). 
There are also other manufacturing companies in Kaltim Industrial Estate near PT Pupuk Kaltim e.g. PT. Kaltim Parna Industri that produces ammonia and PT Kaltim Methanol Industri that produces methanol. As of 2015, the city is the biggest producer of urea and ammonia in South East Asia.

Energy and mining 

PT Badak LNG was established on 26 November 1974 as a joint-venture company with Pertamina, Total S.A., Vico, and Jilco. It currently produces around 22 million tons of liquefied natural gas (LNG) per year, most of which is exported to Japan. PT Indominco, a coal mining company, was established in 1977. It is owned by a Thai company, Banpu, and extracts up to 11 million tons of coal per year. The coal is mainly sold to electricity companies in Japan, Korea, and Taiwan.

Governance

Local government 
As with all Indonesian cities, Bontang is a second-level administrative division run by a mayor and vice mayor together with the city parliament, and it is equivalent to regency. Executive power lies with the mayor and vice mayor, while legislative duties are undertaken by the local parliament.  The mayor, vice mayor and parliament members are democratically elected by people of the city. Heads of districts are appointed directly by the city mayor following recommendations by the city secretary.

Politics 
The city is part of 6th electoral district in provincial level, together with Berau Regency and East Kutai Regency, having 12 out of 55 representatives in provincial parliament of East Kalimantan. At city level, the city parliament consists of 25 representatives from 3 electoral districts. The last election for representatives was in 2019 and the next one will be on 2024.

Administrative divisions 
Bontang is bordered by East Kutai Regency to the North, Kutai Kartanegara Regency to the South and West, by the Makassar Strait to the East. Bontang is divided into three districts (kecamatan), listed below with their areas and their populations at the 2010 census and the 2020 census, together with the official estimates as at mid 2021.

Infrastructure

Education 
There are 61 elementary schools, 34 junior high schools, and 27 senior high schools (including vocational) in the city as of 2019. There is no public university in the city. However, the city has four higher education institutions, all of which are private. The most notable of these is Bontang Industrial Technology College (STTIB, short for Sekolah Tinggi Teknologi Industri Bontang). School participation rate as of 2020 was 99%. The only higher education institution with university status in the city is Trunajaya University, which is also private.

Health 

As of 2019, there are five hospitals in the city, 6 puskesmas, 13 clinics, and 119 healthcare centers. One of the hospitals, Taman Husada Bontang Regional Hospital, is a public hospital owned by the city government. It is categorized as a B-class hospital by Ministry of Health. A new public hospital is currently under construction as of August 2020 and is expected to be categorized as D-class.

Places of worship 
There are 218 mosques, 58 churches, and one Hindu temple in the city as of 2020.

Transportation 

Bontang city has 204.4 kilometers of road, of which around 100.05 kilometers have been paved with asphalt. The city also has six public transport terminals used mainly by buses and angkots as of 2020. The only airport in the city is PT Badak Bontang Airport, which is a private airport owned by Badak NGL. The principal seaport serving the city is Loktuan Port, which as of 2020 is undergoing a massive expansion to support the new Indonesian capital in Kalimantan and to relieve traffic from the crowded port of Balikpapan. Online motorcycle and conventional taxis provided by Gojek and Grab have already established a presence in the city. A toll road connecting the city to Samarinda is already planned. Construction is expected to begin in late 2021.

Climate 
Bontang has a tropical rainforest climate. As such the temperature is warm and relatively stable throughout the year. Rainfall is frequent and abundant. Two minor seasonal periods can be identified: one drier than the other. The so-called "dry" season lasts approximately from May until September (but average lower precipitations remain above 80 mm per month). The "rainy" season starts around November and ends around May.

References

External links
 

 
1999 establishments in Indonesia